Merulina is a genus of stony corals in the family Merulinidae. Members of this genus are native to the Indo-Pacific region and their ranges extend from the Red Sea through the Indian Ocean as far as Japan and the southern central Pacific Ocean. Merulina ampliata is the type species.

Characteristics
Colonies can be laminar, foliose, columnar or arborescent, and can adopt all of these forms in a single colony. On laminar plates, valleys radiate from the centre, becoming contorted on branching structures.

Species 
The following species are currently recognized by the World Register of Marine Species :

Merulina ampliata  (Ellis & Solander, 1786)
†Merulina isseli (Prever, 1922) 
Merulina rotunda  Nemenzo, 1959
Merulina scabricula  Dana, 1846
Merulina scheeri  Head, 1983
Merulina triangularis  (Veron & Pichon, 1980)

References 

Merulinidae
Scleractinia genera
Taxa named by Christian Gottfried Ehrenberg